Ion Roată is a commune in Ialomița County, Muntenia, Romania. It is composed of two villages, Broșteni and Ion Roată.

At the 2011 census, of the inhabitants for whom data were available, 87.4% were Romanians and 12.5% Roma. 99.9% of inhabitants were Romanian Orthodox.

The commune stretches for some  along the Ialomița River valley; Ion Roată village is to the east and Broșteni to the west. It lies in the center of the Bărăgan Plain, and the terrain is largely flat and arid. About 86.5% of the surface area is arable land, 6.5% forests, 3% waters, 2% buildings, 1.5% roads and 0.5% unproductive terrain. Valea Măcrișului is to the north; to the south, the river forms the border with Axintele; Sfântu Gheorghe is to the east and Alexeni to the west. There is a Căile Ferate Române rail station in the commune center; Urziceni is  distant and the county seat Slobozia .

The oldest mention of part of the commune dates to 1582, when a Cioara village appears in a document of Mihnea Turcitul. As of 1778, the area belonged to the Grindu plasă. Between 1864 and 1882, the commune passed through various administrative changes, but from the latter date until after World War I, its villages were Principesa Maria (named after Princess Maria), Broștenii Noi, Slujitori and Malu. During the interwar period, they were Broștenii Vechi, Principesa Maria and Cioara (formerly Slujitori). In 1948, with the advent of the communist regime, the villages were Ion Roată (formerly Principesa Maria), Broștenii Noi (earlier a commune), Broștenii Vechi and Cioara. By 1968, when a new administrative law was passed, Cioara had become Colinele; that village plus Broștenii Vechi was merged into Ion Roată, leaving the commune with its present two villages.

References

Communes in Ialomița County
Localities in Muntenia